Glendale School District is a small school district in Glendale, Oregon, United States.

It serves two schools: Glendale Jr/Sr High School and Glendale Elementary School.

References

External links
Glendale School District (official website)

School districts in Oregon
Education in Douglas County, Oregon